Alexander Benjamin Bradley (born 27 January 1999) is a footballer who plays for  side Tamworth, as a midfielder. Born in England, he is a Finnish youth international.

Early life
Bradley was born in Worcester. He is half-Finnish; his mother is from Finland. He attended Royal Grammar School Worcester.

Club career

West Bromwich Albion

Bradley joined West Bromwich Albion at the age of 7. He spent the first half of the 2018–19 season on loan at Havant & Waterlooville, before moving on loan to Burton Albion in January 2019. He was released by West Brom at the end of his contract

Lincoln City

After a successful trial, he joined Lincoln City on 24 July 2019. He moved on loan to Harrogate Town in August 2019. A year after first joining Lincoln, he would make his debut starting the game in the EFL Cup on 5 September 2020.

Yeovil Town

On 3 November 2020, he joined Yeovil Town on a short-term loan until 10 January 2021. He made his debut on 14 November, playing the full 90 minutes of a 1–1 draw at Woking. On 11 January 2021, Bradley signed for Yeovil on a permanent 18-month contract. At the end of the 2021–22 season, Bradley was released by Yeovil following the expiry of his contract.

Tamworth
On 28 June 2022, Alex signed for Southern League Premier Division Central side Tamworth.

Bradley made his debut for Tamworth on 6 August 2022, in a Southern League Premier Division Central fixture at home to Ilkeston Town; Bradley was substituted on the 75th minute for Alex Jones. The match finished 1-1.

International career
He has represented Finland at international youth levels, and played at the 2018 UEFA European Under-19 Championship.

Career statistics

References

External links

1999 births
Living people
Sportspeople from Worcester, England
Finnish footballers
Finland youth international footballers
English footballers
Finnish people of English descent
English people of Finnish descent
West Bromwich Albion F.C. players
Havant & Waterlooville F.C. players
Burton Albion F.C. players
English Football League players
National League (English football) players
Association football midfielders
Lincoln City F.C. players
Harrogate Town A.F.C. players
Yeovil Town F.C. players
Tamworth F.C. players